Tyrone Shawn Wilkins, (born December 21, 1969) better known as Little Shawn and Shawn Pen, is an American hip hop artist, rapper, songwriter and producer from East Flatbush, Brooklyn.

He released a single in 1986 My girl Mother (Select Records) and an album called The Voice in the Mirror (Capitol Records) in 1992.

Career

Little Shawn released the single "Dom Perignon" (Uptown Records) featuring fellow Brooklyn rapper The Notorious B.I.G. on 20 July 1995. The music video also featured Busta Rhymes, another rapper from Brooklyn. It peaked at #5 on the Bubbling Under Hot 100 as well as #87 on the Hot R&B/Hip-Hop Singles and #23 on the Hot Rap Tracks charts. The song was featured on the soundtrack to the Fox TV crime drama New York Undercover.

Tupac Shakur was on his way to record a verse for Little Shawn when he was robbed and shot 5 times in 1994.

Legal issues
From 1998 to 2003, Wilkins served time in federal prison for drug trafficking. Wilkins changed his stage name to Shawn Pen after leaving prison.

Discography

Albums

Singles

A.  Charted only on the Hot R&B/Hip-Hop Singles Sales chart.
B.  Charted only on the Bubbling Under Hot 100 chart.

References 

Rappers from New York City
Living people
1969 births
Capitol Records artists
21st-century American rappers